Stephen Miles may refer to:

 Stephen A. Miles (born 1967), author and consultant
 Stephen Boyd Miles (1822–1898), frontiersman, stagecoach magnate, cattle rancher, banker and philanthropist

See also
Steven Miles (disambiguation)